Eduardo Cruickshank Smith (born 29 January 1958) is a Costa Rican politician as well as an Evangelical pastor, lawyer, and notary. He is the former President of the Costa Rican parliament, a position he held from 2020 to 2021. He is the first Afro-Costa Rican to ever hold that position.

Personal life
Cruickshank was born in a Jamaican-Costa Rican family of 8 children. His brother Clinton Cruickshank Smith is also a politician, being a former legislator and former presidential candidate of the National Liberation Party. His father as a carpenter and his mother was a housewife.

Before entering politics he was pastor at the Colina de su Gloria church in his hometown of Limón, and has a degree in law from the University of Costa Rica. He is married to Jeannette Edwards and has two children: Jermaine Eduardo Cruickshank Edwards and Yocelyn Shavony Cruickshank Edwards. He is also a grandfather.

Political career
Having been first elected to the Legislative assembly of Costa Rica in 2018, he was elected president of said assembly in 2020.

In the Spring of 2021 Cruickshank announced his candidacy for the upcoming 2022 Costa Rican general election, running on an anti-corruption and pro-business campaign.

References

1958 births
Living people
People from Limón Province
Costa Rican people of Jamaican descent
20th-century Costa Rican lawyers
Costa Rican evangelicals
Costa Rican clergy
Evangelical pastors
Members of the Legislative Assembly of Costa Rica
University of Costa Rica alumni